Kevadia (now known as Ekta Nagar) is a census town in Narmada district in the Indian state of Gujarat. The town is best known as the location of the Statue of Unity, the tallest statue in the world. The town is also home to the Ekta Nagar railway station.

Demographics
 India census, Ekta Nagar had a population of 12,705. Males constitute 53% of the population and females 47%. Ekta Nagar has an average literacy rate of 80%, higher than the national average of 59.5%: male literacy is 85%, and female literacy is 75%. In Ekta Nagar, 11% of the population is under 6 years of age.

Tourist Attractions

 Statue of Unity
 Statue of Unity Tent City
 Valley of Flowers
 Nutrition Park
 Sardar Patel Zoological Park
 Narmada Tent City
 Butterfly Park
 Sardar Sarovar Dam
 Shoolpaneshwar Wildlife Sanctuary
 Maze Garden

References

See also
List of cities and towns in India
15 Best Places To Stay Near Statue Of Unity

Cities and towns in Narmada district